Lorella Bellato is an Italian paracanoer who has competed since the late 2000s. She won a bronze medal in the V-1 200 m LTA, TA, A event at the 2010 ICF Canoe Sprint World Championships in Poznań.

References
2010 ICF Canoe Sprint World Championships women's V-1 200 m LTA, TA, A results. - accessed 20 August 2010.

Italian female canoeists
Living people
Year of birth missing (living people)